R. D. Chula De Silva, PC is a Sri Lankan lawyer and politician.

Educated at Royal College Colombo, he gained a B.A. from the University of Ceylon and was awarded a Rhodes Scholarship (to the University of Oxford) where he gained a degree of Bachelor of Civil Law.

He gained prominence as a lawyer being appointed as a President's Counsel and was instrumental in the establishment of the Sihala Urumaya political party.

References

Sinhalese lawyers
Alumni of Royal College, Colombo
President's Counsels (Sri Lanka)
Living people
Sri Lankan Rhodes Scholars
Alumni of the University of Oxford
Year of birth missing (living people)